JUDUCA (Juegos Deportivos de Universidades Centro America) Sportive Games of Central American Universities is a biennial multi-sport competition aimed at promoting sports in public universities in Central America. The meet was first held in 2006 at the University of Costa Rica. Since then, JUDUCA has become an important sports event among young Central American college athletes.

Student athletes compete in 10 events: chess, athletics, basketball, football, futsal, volleyball, karate, taekwondo, judo, and baseball. JUDUCA hosts 21 public universities from the 7 Central American countries. In 2016, JUDUCA also invited some of the Caribbean nations.

JUDUCA 2016 was organised in Honduras.

Multi-sport events